Eugene Matthews may refer to:
 Eugene Matthews (bishop), Roman Catholic bishop and archbishop
 Eugene S. Matthews, Florida politician and newspaperman